John Patrick Hamilton, VC (24 January 1896 – 27 February 1961) was an Australian recipient of the Victoria Cross, the highest award for gallantry in the face of the enemy that can be awarded to British and Commonwealth forces.

Early life
Born in Orange, New South Wales, Hamilton described himself as a butcher when he enlisted aged eighteen, as a private in the 1st Australian Imperial Force on 15 September 1914. His father William Hamilton was also a butcher and they resided together in Penshurst, Sydney when the younger Hamilton joined up. He was assigned to the 3rd Battalion (N.S.W.) and embarked from Sydney in October 1914 on HMAT Euripides. After training in Egypt his battalion sailed for Gallipoli and took part in the landing at Anzac Cove on 25 April 1915 – his battalion coming ashore in the second and third waves.

First World War
Hamilton was 19 years old, and still a private when the following deed took place at Sasse's Sap during the Battle of Lone Pine on the Gallipoli Peninsula for which he was awarded the VC:

The 3rd Battalion was decimated at Lone Pine but, after the withdrawal from Gallipoli and reorganization in Egypt the Battalion was redeployed to the Western Front in March 1916 and went into the line at Armentières. Hamilton was promoted corporal on 3 May and fought at the Battle of Pozières in July, the Battle of Mouquet Farm in August and Flers in November. He was promoted sergeant in May 1917 and that year his battalion served at Bullecourt and at the Menin Road and Broodseinde theatres of the Battle of Passchendale.

After officer cadet training at Cambridge, England from July 1918 he was commissioned a Second Lieutenant in January 1919 and promoted Lieutenant in April 1919. After demobilisation, he was discharged in September 1919.

Second World War
During the Second World War Hamilton served as a lieutenant with the 16th Garrison Battalion and several training battalions. In 1942 he went to New Guinea with the 2/3rd Pioneer Battalion, then served with Australian Labour Employment Companies until 1944 when he transferred to the Australian Army Labour Service. He was promoted captain in the Australian Military Forces in October 1944. He returned to Sydney in April 1946.

Between and post the wars
He was a wharf labourer for over thirty years, also working as a shipping clerk, storeman and packer. He was an active in the Waterside Workers' Federation and in the Sydney branch of the Australian Labor Party.

Hamilton died of cerebro-vascular disease in the Concord Repatriation General Hospital on 27 February 1961 and is buried in Woronora cemetery. His Victoria Cross is displayed at the Australian War Memorial and was the only one awarded to Hamilton's unit during the war.

Honours and awards

References

Footnotes

Sources
 William A. Land, 'Hamilton, John (1896–1961)', Australian Dictionary of Biography, Volume 9, Melbourne University Press, 1983, p. 176.

Australian World War I recipients of the Victoria Cross
Australian Gallipoli campaign recipients of the Victoria Cross
Australian Army soldiers
Military personnel from New South Wales
Australian waterside workers
1896 births
1961 deaths
People from the Central West (New South Wales)
Burials at Woronora Memorial Park